Howard Mumford Jones (April 16, 1892 – May 11, 1980) was an American intellectual historian, literary critic, journalist, poet, and professor of English at the University of Michigan and later at Harvard University.

Jones was the book editor for The Boston Evening Transcript.

Background
Howard Mumford Jones was born on April 16, 1892, in Saginaw, Michigan.  He attended the University of Wisconsin–Madison as an undergraduate, winning oratorical contests there

Career
Before moving to Harvard University, Jones was a member of the English faculty at the University of North Carolina at Chapel Hill.  In 1925 he approached president Harry Woodburn Chase, lamenting the absence of a bookstore in the town of Chapel Hill, and offered to open one in his office.  This eventually became the Bull's Head Bookshop, now located in Student Stores.

In February 1954, Jones gave the dedicatory address at the opening of an addition to the University of Wisconsin's Memorial Library, entitled "Books and the Independent Mind."  The crux of his comments was contained in this comment:  "While it is true that we in this nation remain free to be idiotic, it does not necessarily follow that we must be idiotic in order to be free!"

Personal life and death
In 1927, Jones married the former Bessie Judith Zaban, of Atlanta, Georgia, in New York City, and they remained married until his death.

Howard Mumford Jones died age 88 on May 11, 1980, in Cambridge, Massachusetts, after a brief illness.

Awards
 1965: Pulitzer Prize for General Non-Fiction for O Strange New World: American Culture-The Formative Years.

Legacy
The Howard Mumford Jones Professorship of American Studies at Harvard University is named in his honor.

Students of Jones at Harvard included cultural historian David Brion Davis and Betty Miller Unterberger, later the first woman professor at Texas A&M University and also the first woman president of the Society for Historians of American Foreign Relations. Jones introduced Unterberger to the technical advantages of using a dictaphone while writing history. (Jones also urged her to marry her future husband Robert Unterberger, now a retired professor of geophysics at TAMU.)   Another, early student was communist lawyer John J. Abt.

Quotations
 "Ours is the age which is proud of machines that think and suspicious of men who try to."

Works
Jones wrote scholarly articles as well as the following books:

 Gargoyles and Other Poems (Boston, Mass.: The Cornhill Company, 1918) read online
 America and French Culture: 1750-1848 (University of North Carolina Press, 1927) read online
 Ideas in America (Russell & Russell, 1944) read online
 The Bright Medusa (University of Illinois Press, 1952) read online
 The Pursuit of Happiness (Harvard University Press, 1953) read online
 American Humanism: Its Meaning for World Survival (New York: Harper, 1957) read online
 One Great Society: Humane Learning in the United States (NY: Harcourt, Brace, 1959) read online
 The Scholar as American (Harvard University Press, 1960) read online
 Humane Traditions in America: A List of Suggested Readings, Volume 1 (Harvard University Press, 1961) read online
 The University and the New World (University of Toronto Press, 1963) read online
 O Strange New World: American Culture—The Formative Years (Viking Press, 1964) (Pulitzer Prize for General Nonfiction)
 History and the Contemporary: Essays in Nineteenth-Century Literature (University of Wisconsin Press, 1964) read online
 Belief and Disbelief in American Culture (University of Chicago Press, 1969) read online
 The Age of Energy: Varieties of American Experience, 1865-1915 (Viking Press, 1971) read online
 Revolution and Romanticism (Harvard University Press, 1974) read online
 Howard Mumford Jones: An Autobiography (1979) read online

Jones also wrote the introduction to Thomas Wentworth Higginson's book Army Life in a Black Regiment (Michigan State University Press, 1960).

See also

References

External links
 Jones, Howard Mumford, 1892-, recipient. Miscellaneous papers: Guide at Houghton Library, Harvard College Library
  Papers of Howard Mumford Jones, 1936-1980
 Ludwig, Richard M., Aspects of American Poetry: Essays Presented to Howard Mumford Jones (Ohio State University Press, 1963) read online
 Brier, Peter A., Howard Mumford Jones and the Dynamics of Liberal Humanism (University of Missouri Press, 1994) read online online review by David Levin

1892 births
1980 deaths
20th-century American non-fiction writers
Boston Evening Transcript people
Harvard University faculty
Pulitzer Prize for General Non-Fiction winners
20th-century American male writers
University of Michigan faculty
American male non-fiction writers
University of Wisconsin–Madison alumni
Presidents of the Modern Language Association